Doha Forum (DF) (Arabic: منتدى الدوحة) is a forum held annually since 2003 in Doha, the capital city of Qatar. It is aimed at promoting dialogue, bringing together leaders in policy making to discuss critical challenges facing the world, and to build innovative and action-driven networks. The 2022 edition of the forum was held on 26–27 March.

The Doha forum is sponsored by the state of Qatar under the banner "Diplomacy, Dialogue, Diversity", and since inception has seen the presence of several individuals from all over the globe. The 2003 forum which happened to the be anaugral forum saw more than 140 participants including ambassadors, congressmen and other dignitaries.

Doha Forum 2022 
The Doha Forum 2022, which held between 26 and 27 March 2022 at Sheraton Grand, Doha, Qatar under the theme "Transforming for the New Era" focused on Geopolitical Alliances and International Relations, Financial System and Economic Development, Defense, Cyber and Food Security and Climate Change and Sustainability.

Some of the speakers at the forum were:

  H.H Sheikh Tamim Bin Hamad Al Thani 
  H.H. Faisal Bin Farhan Al Saud (Minister of Foreign Affairs, Saudi Arabia)
  H.E. John Kerry (United States Special Presidential Envoy for Climate and Former Secretary of State)
  Josep Borrell (High Representative of the European Union for Foreign Affairs and Security Policy)
  Emine Dzhaparova (First Deputy Minister for Foreign Affairs, Ukraine)

Previous forums

2003 
The 2003 forum was held between the 14 and 15 April 2003 at The Ritz Carlton Hotel, Doha. It had more than 140 attendees from all over the world and it centred around issues bordering democracy and free trade as a general starting point from which stemmed several closely related topics.

Some of the participants included:

  Dr Giandomenico Picco (personal representative of the Secretary General for United Nations Year of Dialogue among Civilizations)
 Mr Frederic SICRE (World Economic Forum)
  H.E. Patrick Theros (Former US Ambassador to Qatar)
  Dr Ahmed Hassan (Dehli Director General Strategic Studies Centre)
  Mr Mahfus Anam

2004 
The Conference was held on the 5 and 6 April 2004 in Doha and was anaugrated by the Highness Sheikh Hamad Bin Khalifa Al Thani,Emir of the State of Qatar in the presence of about (500) participants representing several official academic, research, information and cultural circles from all over the world.

Some of the participants included:

  Abdallah Baabood (Businessman)
  Abdallah Sahar (Professor in Foreign Relations)
  Akiko Yamanaka (The United Nations University)
  Alain Malreix (Deputy, National Assembly)
  Alessandra Paradisi (Head of Mediterranian Relations Radio Televisione Italiana (RAI)

2005 
The conference was held between 29–30 March 2005 at the Ritz Carlton Hotel and was attended by more than 500 participants. It focused on global democracy and the role of women and internal reforms.

Some of the participants were:

  Dr Madawi Al Rasheed (Kings College, University of London)
  Sheila Jackson (Member of US Congress)
  Dr Gerd Nonneman (Lancaster University)
  H.E. Sergey Glaziev (Member of Russian Parliament)
  Mr Wadah Khanfar (Director of Al-Jazeera Satellite Channel)

2006

2007

2008

2009

2010

References 

Economy of Qatar